Carl Braun Sennhenn is an American writer and academic who served from as the 14th Poet Laureate of Oklahoma from 2001 until 2003. Along with Francine Ringold, he is one of two poets to win the Oklahoma Book Award for Poetry twice, in 2007 and in 2013. He is a former professor at Rose State College, where he also served as a Dean of Humanities.

Early life and education 
Sennhenn was born in Baltimore, Maryland and raised in Norman, Oklahoma. He earned a Bachelor of Arts and Master of Arts from the University of Oklahoma, in 1958 and 1960 respectively.

Career 
Sennhenn has worked as an educator for over 60 years, from the elementary to college level. Though now semi-retired, he continues to teach Creative Writing for senior adults at Rose State College.

Bibliography 
 The Center of Noon. Norman: Poetry Around, 1989
 Harvest of Light. Norman: Poetry Around, 1987
 Nocturns and Sometimes, Even I. Cheyenne, OK: Village Books Press, 2012.
 Travels Through Enchanted Woods. Cheyenne, OK: Village Books Press, 2006.

See also 

 Poets Laureate of Oklahoma

References

Living people
Year of birth missing (living people)
Place of birth missing (living people)
Poets Laureate of Oklahoma
Academics from Oklahoma